Potma is the name of several inhabited localities in Russia.

Urban localities
Potma, Zubovo-Polyansky District, Republic of Mordovia, a work settlement in Zubovo-Polyansky District of the Republic of Mordovia; 

Rural localities
Potma, Atyuryevsky District, Republic of Mordovia, a village in Mordovsko-Kozlovsky Selsoviet of Atyuryevsky District in the Republic of Mordovia; 
Potma, Kovylkinsky District, Republic of Mordovia, a settlement in Troitsky Selsoviet of Kovylkinsky District in the Republic of Mordovia; 
Potma, Penza Oblast, a selo in Shirokoissky Selsoviet of Mokshansky District in Penza Oblast
Potma, Arkadaksky District, Saratov Oblast, a village in Arkadaksky District of Saratov Oblast
Potma, Rtishchevsky District, Saratov Oblast, a railway crossing loop in Rtishchevsky District of Saratov Oblast
Potma, Rtishchevsky District, Saratov Oblast, a selo in Rtishchevsky District of Saratov Oblast
Potma, Ulyanovsk Oblast, a selo in Valdivatsky Rural Okrug of Karsunsky District in Ulyanovsk Oblast